Batilly is a commune in the Meurthe-et-Moselle department in northeastern France.

Population

SOVAB
Batilly is home to Société de Véhicules Automobiles de Batilly (SOVAB), which is a major automotive factory. The Renault Master is produced here, as well as badge engineered versions by Opel, Nissan and Vauxhall. Providing 2,700 jobs, the factory is a major centre of employment in the region.

See also 
 Communes of the Meurthe-et-Moselle department

References

Communes of Meurthe-et-Moselle